Ernesto Franceschi (26 March 1912 – 21 February 1943) was an Italian bobsledder who competed in the mid-1930s. He competed in the four-man event at the 1936 Winter Olympics in Garmisch-Partenkirchen, but did not finish.

References
1936 bobsleigh four-man results
1936 Olympic Winter Games official report - p. 415.
Ernesto Franceschi's profile at Sports Reference.com

1912 births
1943 deaths
Italian male bobsledders
Olympic bobsledders of Italy
Bobsledders at the 1936 Winter Olympics